Mobilvetta Design was a cycling team from 1998 to 2004, based in Italy.

History
At the end of the 1997 season, Refin–Mobilvetta disbanded because the main sponsor Refin stopped. The subsponsor Mobilvetta then created a new team, with new cyclists, new team leaders and a new bicycle.

The team rode in the 1999, 2000, 2001, 2002, 2003, and 2004 Giro d'Italia.

Defunct cycling teams based in Italy
1998 establishments in Italy
2004 disestablishments in Italy
Cycling teams established in 1998
Cycling teams disestablished in 2004